Wong Man-kong may refer to:
 Peter Wong Man-kong (1949–2019), politician from Hong Kong
 Timothy Wong Man-kong, historian from Hong Kong